Megacamelus is an extinct genus of terrestrial herbivore in the family Camelidae, endemic to North America from the Miocene through Pliocene 10.3—4.9 mya, existing for approximately .

This was one of the largest genera of camelid to roam the Earth together with Megatylopus, Gigantocamelus, Camelus moreli, Camelus knoblochi, Aepycamelus, and Paracamelus.

Taxonomy
Megacamelus was named by Frick (1929). It was assigned to Camelidae by Frick (1929) and Honey et al. (1998).

Fossil distribution
Fossils have been found from Nebraska to Idaho to Southern California.

References

 

Prehistoric camelids
Prehistoric even-toed ungulate genera
Miocene even-toed ungulates
Pliocene even-toed ungulates
Pliocene extinctions
Neogene mammals of North America
Fossil taxa described in 1929